Alexander Everett Motter (June 20, 1913 – October 18, 1996) was a Canadian ice hockey player who played 265 games in the National Hockey League with the Boston Bruins and Detroit Red Wings between 1934 and 1943. He won the Stanley Cup in 1943 with the Detroit Red Wings. Motter was born in Melville, Saskatchewan.

Motter scored his first NHL goal on March 8, 1936 as a member of the Boston Bruins.  It came in his team's 5-2 win over Detroit at Olympia Stadium.  It was the only goal Motter would ever score for Boston.

Career statistics

Regular season and playoffs

External links
 

1913 births
1996 deaths
Boston Bruins players
Boston Cubs players
Canadian ice hockey defencemen
Cleveland Barons (1937–1973) players
Detroit Red Wings players
Ice hockey people from Saskatchewan
Indianapolis Capitals players
Philadelphia Rockets players
Providence Reds players
Regina Pats players
Springfield Indians players
Sportspeople from Melville, Saskatchewan
Stanley Cup champions
United States Coast Guard Cutters players
United States Coast Guard personnel of World War II
Canadian expatriates in the United States